John G. Walker may refer to:

John George Walker (1821 - 1893), Confederate general in the American Civil War
John Grimes Walker (1835 - 1907), United States Navy admiral